Luis Humberto Normandín (19 September 1932 – 11 November 2004) was an Argentine water polo player who competed in the 1952 Summer Olympics.

References

External links
 

1932 births
2004 deaths
Argentine male water polo players
Olympic water polo players of Argentina
Water polo players at the 1952 Summer Olympics